Whipped or whipping may refer to:
 Whipped (2000 film), an American independent comedy film
 Whipped (2020 film), an Indonesian film
 Whipped!, an album by Faster Pussycat 
 "Whipped", a song by Axium from The Story Thus Far
 "Whipped", a song by Jon Secada from Heart, Soul & a Voice
 "Whipping" (song), a 1994 song by grunge band Pearl Jam, from their album Vitalogy

See also
 Whip (disambiguation)
 Whipped cream
 Whipper (disambiguation)